The Eurostar E3000 is a generic satellite model most commonly used for commercial and military communications satellites manufactured by Airbus Defence and Space (formerly Astrium). It is a member of Airbus Defence and Space's Eurostar family. It utilises a chemical, bi-propellant propulsion system for orbit raising and on-station manoeuvres with an optional plasma propulsion system (PPS). The PPS harnesses the Newtonian effect as a result of the ionisation of xenon gas employed by the use of Hall effect plasma thrusters. This system is most commonly used for north–south station-keeping. The E3000 was the first commercial satellite family to use lithium–ion batteries rather than the older nickel-based technologies for power supply during eclipses.

They tend to feature between 50 and 90 transponders, most often in the Ku-band and C-band.

There have been 52 satellites built around the E3000 platform including ANASIS 2, Hispasat's Amazonas 1 and 2, Arabsat-5A, -5B, and -5C, Astra 1M, 1N, 2E, 2F, 2G, 3B and 5B, Eutelsat's W3A and Hot Bird 8–10, Intelsat 10-02, KA-SAT, Atlantic Bird 7, 70B Telesat's Anik F1R, F3 and Nimiq-4, Skynet 5A–C and the Inmarsat 4-series of satellites. Each of the three Inmarsat 4 in service has a large deployable reflector as the main antenna.

In March 2015, Airbus Defence and Space received a delivery of new 3D-printed brackets for mounting telemetry and tele-command antennas, being the first space-qualified 3D-printed component of its kind.

Eurostar E3000EOR 
Also in March 2015, Airbus signed a contract with Snecma for 5-kilowatt PPS5000 Hall-effect thrusters for the E3000 Electric Orbit Raising (E3000EOR) variant of the satellite bus. New thrusters would allow reducing the weight of a satellite by up to 40%., as Türksat 5A and Türksat 5B

Eurostar Neo
An improved model based on the E3000 called the Eurostar Neo was announced in 2017, offering electric, hybrid, or chemical propulsion, in addition to a scalable power range of 7 kW to 25 kW.

References

External links 
 Airbus's page about the satellite

Satellite buses